Podhorany is a small village and municipality in Prešov District in the Prešov Region of north Slovakia.

History
In historical records the village was first mentioned in 1240.

Geography

Population 
It has a population of about 849 people (2020-12-31).

References

External links
 
 
http://www.statistics.sk/mosmis/eng/run.html

Villages and municipalities in Prešov District
Šariš